Erlang Shen or Erlang, also known as the Lord of Sichuan, is a Chinese god with a third truth-seeing eye in the middle of his forehead.

Erlang Shen may be a deified version of several semi-mythical folk heroes who helped regulate China's torrential floods dating variously from the Qin, Sui, and Jin dynasties. A later Buddhist source identifies him as the second son of the Northern Heavenly King Vaishravana.

In the Ming semi-mythical novels Creation of the Gods and Journey to the West, Erlang Shen is the nephew of the Jade Emperor. In the former, he assists the Zhou army in defeating the Shang. In the latter, he is the second son of a mortal and the Jade Emperor's sister Yaoji. In the legend, he is known as the greatest warrior god of heaven.

Origin and representations
Some common representations of Erlang Shen include Yang Jian, Li Erlang, Yang Bliss and others. The representation of Erlang Shen as Yang Jian is most common in popular media.

Li Erlang 

Li Erlang was the second son of Li Bing from the Qin dynasty.

According to the "Story about Li Bing and His Son in Harnessing the Rivers" in the Records of Guansian, Li Erlang assisted his father in the construction of the complex irrigation system that prevented the Min River from flooding and irrigated the Chengdu Plain. In thanks for the prosperity that this brought to them, the local people elevated the father and son to gods and dedicated the Two Kings Temple in their honor.

Legend states that Governor Li Bing sent his son out to discover the source of the flooding. He spent a year exploring the county without success. One day whilst sheltering in a cave, he encountered a tiger which he slew and seven hunters who had witnessed this bravery agreed to join him in his quest.

The group finally came to a cottage on the outskirts of Guan County (modern Dujiangyan City). From within they heard the sound of an old woman crying. The woman was Grandma Wang and she told them that her grandson was to be sacrificed to an evil dragon who was the local river god. Li Erlang reported this to his father who devised a plan to capture the dragon.

The eight friends hid in the River God Temple and jumped out on the dragon when it arrived to claim its offering. The dragon fled to the river pursued by Li Erlang, who eventually captured it. Grandma Wang arrived with an iron chain and the dragon was secured in the pool below the Dragon-Taming Temple, freeing the region from floods.

Another legend tells of Li Erlang suppressing a fire dragon that lived in the mountains north of Dujiangyan by climbing to the top of Mount Yulei, turning into a giant and building a dam with 66 mountains then filling it with water from Dragon Pacifying Pool.

Theatrical interpretation (Bao Lian Deng)
Erlang's mother, Princess Yaoji, was the goddess of the realm of desire in heaven. Her job was to limit the gods' mortal urges such as love, affection, greed, and ambition. When she pursued an evil dragon who broke free of its heavenly prison into the mortal realm and was injured by it, she fell in love with Yang Tianyou, a mortal scholar, who saved her life by giving her his own heart to replace the one the dragon damaged. They had three children: Yang Jiao, Yang Jian (Erlang Shen), and Yang Chan (Holy Mother of Hua Shan). When the Jade Emperor discovered her marriage, he sent his armies to kill her family and capture her. Only Erlang and his sister Yang Chan survived.

As Li Bing
As Li Bing, the first hydraulic engineer in the Shu area, was the hero who stopped the flooding of the Min River by constructing the Dujiangyan. This somehow led to Li Bing being turned into a folk hero who defeated a river god in order to save his prefecture from being flooded, where this story had then associated him as a new river god that protected the local people in the area from floods. However, a discrepancy comes up that even though Li Bing/Erlang was known as Guankou Shen, the river that he is associated with is in Qianwei and not Guankou. 
Another  discrepancy is that Li Erlang had never appeared in any of the tales related to stopping the Min River. The first appearance of Li Erlang was in Zhishui ji  by Li Ying  of the Liang  Dynasty.

Historically Li Bing was conferred an official title until the Five Dynasties period under the rule of the Shu kingdom. He rose to political power when the great flood that occurred on the twenty-sixth day of the eighth month in 920 AD was reported to the emperor by Daoist Du Guangting .

Yang Jian
Many legends and novels often describe Erlang as Yang Jian, a nephew of the Jade Emperor. According to an ancient text, Erlang Baojuan, Yang Jian's mother, was the Jade Emperor's sister, Princess Yaoji who was imprisoned under Mount Tao because she violated the Heavenly Rules by marrying a human named Yang Tianyou. Many years later, her son Yang Jian cleaved Mount Tao using his axe, hoping to set his mother free. He did successfully rescue his mother after he chased away the sun by carrying a mountain on his back.

In the 2009 TV series Prelude of Lotus Lantern, he was not successful in the rescue mission as his mother was quickly incinerated by ten of her nephews. A grieving Yang Jian slaughtered nine of the ten sun deities with his axe. Later, he was dissuaded from killing the last sun by the moon goddess Chang'e and married a Dragon Princess, though it was an unhappy marriage that ended in divorce. After divorcing the abusive Dragon Princess, Yang Jian went to the celestial realms to take up the position of the Judicial God (司法天神), being in charge of enforcing the heavenly laws throughout the three realms with an iron fist. Both these incidents are entirely modern theatrical adaptations of the old myth.

Other identifications
Erlang Shen is also identified with Zhao Yu, a hermit who lived on Mount Qingcheng and was appointed by Emperor Yang of Sui as Governor of Jiazhou. Zhao Yu is said to have set forth with 1000 men to defeat a flood dragon that had been tormenting the area. Upon reaching the river, Zhao Yu dived into the water with his double-edged sword and emerged holding the dragon’s head. Following his death, according to the Chronicle of Changshu County, the region was once again plagued by flood and he was seen riding a white horse amidst the swirling currents. The locals built a temple enshrining Zhao Yu as the god Erlang and the floods were subdued.

Deng Xia is said to have been a general under Erlang who surpassed his predecessors in valor and defeated a flood dragon, receiving the title "Erlang Shen" and a temple in his honor at Zhongqingli in Hangzhou.

Representation in Chinese culture as Yang Jian

Journey to the West
Erlang makes an appearance near the start of the classic Journey to the West by Wu Cheng'en. Erlang, who is titled as being either True Lord or Illustrious Sage, is the nephew of the Jade Emperor. Erlang made his first appearance when he had been ordered by the Jade Emperor (in which Erlang was also with his seven elite sages whom he called his brothers) to subdue Sun Wukong, who was to be punished for his havoc in heaven.

Throughout the course of Erlang's duel between Sun Wukong, Erlang had been the stronger adversary though Sun Wukong always managed to stay ahead and at times get the better of Erlang thanks to his quick wits. After many transformations that were performed in their duel (Sun Wukong fleeing as a fish; Erlang and Sun Wukong becoming larger birds, and so forth), near the conclusion of the battle, he managed to see through Sun Wukong's disguise (as a temple) using his third eye. He eventually defeated Wukong through teamwork with several other gods; Laozi personally had dropped his refined golden ring that had hit Sun Wukong on the head, giving Erlang a chance to bring him down, and Erlang's dog bit him in the leg. After Sun Wukong had been captured (to which Sun Wukong retorts that they are cowards for attacking from behind), he and his heavenly soldiers would burn random areas of Mount Huaguo. Erlang is seen again far later in the novel when he assists Sun Wukong through chance by fighting against a certain ancient Dragon King and his villainous son-in-law, a nine-headed demon.

Fengshen Yanyi
In Investiture of the Gods, Yang Jian (Yang Bliss) is a disciple of Yuding Zhenren, and he learned fighting and magical skills including the 72 earthly transformations. He first appeared during the time of the Diablo Brothers' attack on the Western Foothills. After hearing of the situation, Yang personally took the offensive against the brothers. During his duel against all four brothers, Yang deliberately allowed himself to be consumed by Diablo Long Life's flying mink (some sources say an elephant). Following the battle, Yang Jian suddenly reappeared before Jiang Ziya after killing the mink inside its stomach with his many transformations. To trick the Diablo Brothers, Yang Jian later transformed himself into Long Life's flying mink and stole Diablo Red's Havoc-Umbrella. Thus, Yang was renowned as the true reason for Jiang Ziya's victory over the Diablo Brothers at an overall point.

Bao Lian Deng
In the tale Lotus Lantern (Bao Lian Deng), Erlang had a sister known as the Holy Mother of Mount Hua (Hua Shan). She married a mortal man, Liu Yanchang, who was a scholar. Together, they had a son by the name of Chen Xiang. She was admonished by Erlang for this unlawful human-deity union and imprisoned under Mount Hua. When Chen Xiang came of age, he split the mountain with an axe to free his mother, but not before facing people who repeatedly tried to undermine his mission, most notably his own uncle Erlang.

As a filial deity
In Chinese belief, he was a filial son that entered the Chinese underworld to save his deceased mother from torment and will punish unfilial children by striking them with thunder as a punishment, hence the Chinese parent saying "Being smitten by lightning for being unfilial and ungrateful" towards unruly children. A warrior deity, he wields a Sān Jiān Liǎng Rèn Dāo ( - "three-pointed, double-edged blade") and always has his faithful Xiàotiān quǎn ( - "Howling Celestial Dog") by his side. This dog also helps him subdue evil spirits.

In popular culture
Erlang Shen is mostly portrayed, whether in ancient legends or games or television, as a noble and powerful warrior god who slays and vanquishes demons and monsters in the mortal realm and who embodies justice and righteousness. He is shown to have vast, superhuman strength, being able to cleave an entire mountain with his axe to save his mother in just one stroke and being capable of 72 Transformations (sometimes said to be 73 Transformations), meaning he can transform into virtually anything he wants.

His main weapon of choice is his "three-pointed, double-edged lance", a long three-pointed spear with two cutting edges of a saber. This spear is powerful enough to penetrate and cleave through steel and stone like wool. Erlang wields the Divine Spear with unmatched skill and superior mastery, being an unstoppable force of destruction in battle when wielding said spear, having slain countless evil gods, monstrous demonic beasts, and vast, massive armies of demons and ogres with it. He is almost always accompanied by his faithful "Howling Celestial Dog", which has the ability to viciously attack, maul, and subdue demons and evil spirits.

Erlang Shen has also been portrayed as possessing a unique skill known as the "Nine Turns Divine Skill". It grants him vast, physical durability of undefined limits and nigh-invulnerability to conventional weapons and various magic spells. In the novel "Creation of the Gods", Erlang was shown to be completely impervious to hits from various powerful mystical objects due to this skill; he has emerged completely unscathed from mystical weapons and artifacts that have proven capable of severely injuring or even killing other immortals.

Erlang Shen, as a god that embodies justice, can execute "Heaven's Punishment" by calling down countless massive, devastating bolts of holy lightning to strike and totally disintegrate evil beings.

The third-eye on his forehead does not have a fixed name, though its most popular name currently is "The Eye of Heaven". It has the ability to differentiate truth from lies and see through deceptions and disguises. It may be used as an offensive weapon, being able to fire continuous, highly destructive blasts of light energy and/or divine fire.

The light and fire blasts from the third-eye possesses vast, almost immeasurable destructive power; enough power to utterly destroy and vaporize anything it hits, even powerful enough to shatter and disintegrate entire mountains or completely erase and obliterate hundreds of thousands of demons from existence in one go or even cripple and destroy immortals that have supposedly indestructible bodies.

Erlang Shen is a playable character in the RPG League of Immortals, an action-adventure game that combines RPG and MOBA gameplay. He is known as only "Erlang" in the game and is of the Immortal Class(), which is strong against the Devil Class().

The playable character Exiled God from the Asian MMORPG Asura Online is based on Erlang Shen in appearance and skills. He is a melee fighter who mainly uses the spear but can also use the sword and crossbow. While most of his skills involves deadly combos with his spear, they include melee attacks with the Celestial Hound and ranged power attacks with his heavenly eye.

In the MOBA game SMITE, he is a playable character who is a melee warrior and his title is "The Illustrious Sage". His is accompanied by his Howling Celestial Dog (his passive) and has abilities utilizing his signature traits: his first is his third eye, his second his spear, his third his 72 Transformations, and his ultimate the "Nine Turns Divine Skill".

The character of Combustion Man from Avatar: The Last Airbender takes inspiration from Erlang Shen.

Dragon Ball character Tien Shinhan is inspired by him. He even has a third eye as well.

In the 1973 animation Chinese Gods, the likeness of Bruce Lee is used to portray him. Here he possesses the third eye, kills a dragon, and fights a shape-shifting priest.

In the Gumballs&Dungeons roguelike RPG for Android, Erlang Shen, accompanied by his dog Xiàotiān quǎn as a sidekick, is a playable character with the "Eye of Heaven" designed as a specific attack for him, causing damage and diminishing the defense of enemies.

In the 2022 mobile game Dislyte, Yun Chuan is a Legendary Esper with the powers of Yang Jian. His transformation includes a third eye and a wolf companion that he can call upon.

See also
Rama
Dog in Chinese mythology
Jiro (given name)

References

Chinese gods
Investiture of the Gods characters
Journey to the West characters